The Basilica of St Mary of the Angels is a Neo-Gothic Roman Catholic Minor basilica in the United States and a prominent landmark of Olean, NY. It is also a parish church, located on the west side of South Union Strert between West Henly Street and Irving Street in downtown Olean, near the Allegheny River. It is considered one of the most visible symbols of Roman Catholicism in Olean, New York.

History

Construction

This Catholic church began in 1852 as a small wooden "shanty" church, built with $300 collected from railroad workers. The noted Franciscan missionary, Rev. Pamphilius DiMagliano, OSF, replaced that church with a more formal building costing $10,000 in 1860. Father DiMagliano dedicated the church to the patroness of the mother-church of the Franciscan Order at Assisi, St. Mary of the Angels.

Construction of the current Gothic Revival church started in 1913 under the supervision of French-trained architect Emile Ulrich of Cleveland.  The Bishop of Buffalo Charles H. Colton laid the cornerstone of the church in November 1913. Completed in 1917 at a total cost of $250,000 (equivalent to $ million in ), the most prominent feature was the twin 150-foot towers capped with stone steeples built almost exclusively of white marble from nearby Pennsylvania.  The church was formally opened and blessed by Venerable Monsignor Nelson Baker on September 26, 1915.

Restorations

In the centennial year of 1952, the entire church interior was redecorated, adding religious images and medallions painted on canvas in New York that was then applied to the walls of the church. Angels on clouds carry banners with the words to the Hail Mary prayer in Latin. "Ora pro nobis peccatoribus, Nunc et in hora mortis nostrae" (Pray for us sinners, now and at the hour of our death).  The altars, railing, pulpit, and baptismal font are crafted from Carrara marble from Italy.

Papal decree

On Feb. 14, 2017, Pope Francis granted the title of Minor Basilica to St. Mary of the Angels in Olean, making it the 83rd basilica in the United States,

Notable associations

In 1940, Thomas Merton, a well-known spiritual writer, came to Olean to teach at St. Bonaventure College. It was in Olean that Thomas Merton made significant choices in his life, as chronicled in his bestselling autobiography The Seven Storey Mountain (1948).  Merton often went to St. Mary of the Angels to pray and to go to confession. At the close of 1940, he stopped into St. Mary of the Angels one last time to pray the stations of the cross before boarding the train taking him to a Trappist monastery in Kentucky. He wrote of a particularly beautiful experience in the church that night in his memoir.
Louis Zamperini was baptized at St. Mary of the Angels in 1917. When he was a young child, his Italian immigrant family moved to California, where he would become a famous Olympic champion and WWII war hero.

See also 
List of Catholic basilicas
Roman Catholic Diocese of Buffalo

References

External links

20th-century Roman Catholic church buildings in the United States
Roman Catholic churches completed in 1915
1852 establishments in New York (state)
Shrines to the Virgin Mary
Basilica churches in New York (state)
Religious organizations established in 1852
Roman Catholic Diocese of Buffalo
Churches in Cattaraugus County, New York